France at the European Athletics Championships has participated in all editions of the European Athletics Championships, held since the first edition of 1934 European Athletics Championships.

Medal count

See also
Athletics in France
Fédération française d'athlétisme

References

External links
 European Athletic Association
 Fédération française d'athlétisme

 
Nations at the European Athletics Championships
Athletics in France